A760 may refer to:
 Motorola A760, a mobile phone produced by Motorola
 Samsung SPH-A760, another mobile phone by Samsung Telecommunications
 A760 road, a road between the British towns of Largs and Lochwinnoch